The Tom is a river in Russia, a left tributary of the river Zeya. Its source is near the border between Amur Oblast and Khabarovsk Krai. It flows into the Zeya (itself a tributary of the Amur) between Svobodny and Blagoveshchensk. The city of Belogorsk lies on the Tom.

See also
List of rivers of Russia

References

Rivers of Amur Oblast